Anton Zeilinger (born 20 May 1945) is an Austrian quantum physicist and Nobel laureate in physics of 2022. Zeilinger is professor of physics emeritus at the University of Vienna and senior scientist at the Institute for Quantum Optics and Quantum Information of the Austrian Academy of Sciences. Most of his research concerns the fundamental aspects and applications of quantum entanglement.

In 2007, Zeilinger received the first Inaugural Isaac Newton Medal of the Institute of Physics, London, for "his pioneering conceptual and experimental contributions to the foundations of quantum physics, which have become the cornerstone for the rapidly-evolving field of quantum information". In October 2022, he received the Nobel Prize in Physics, jointly with Alain Aspect and John Clauser for their outstanding work involving experiments with entangled photons, establishing the violation of Bell inequalities and pioneering quantum information science.

Early life and education 
Anton Zeilinger was born in 1945 in Ried im Innkreis, Upper Austria, Austria. He studied physics at the University of Vienna from 1963 to 1971. He received a doctorate from the University of Vienna in 1971, with a thesis on "Neutron depolarization measurements on a Dy-single crystal" under Helmut Rauch. He qualified as a university lecturer (habilitation) at the Vienna University of Technology in 1979.

Career 

In the 1970s, Zeilinger worked at the Vienna Atominstitut as a research assistant and associate researcher at the  Massachusetts Institute of Technology Neutron Diffraction Laboratory until 1979, when he accepted the position of assistant professor at the same Atominstitut. That year he qualified as a university professor. at the Vienna University of Technology.

In 1981 Zeilinger returned to MIT in 1981 as an associate professor on the physics faculty until 1983. Between 1980 and 1990 he worked as a professor at the Vienna University of Technology, the Technical University of Munich, the University of Innsbruck and the University of Vienna. He was also, between 2004 and 2013, the scientific director of the Institute for Quantum Optics and Quantum Information in Vienna between 2004 and 2013. Zeilinger became professor emeritus at the University of Vienna in 2013. He was president of the Austrian Academy of Sciences from 2013 till 2022.

Since 2006, Zeilinger is the vice chairman of the board of trustees of the Institute of Science and Technology Austria, an ambitious project initiated by Zeilinger's proposal. In 2009, he founded the International Academy Traunkirchen, which is dedicated to the support of gifted students in science and technology. He is a fan of the Hitchhiker's Guide To The Galaxy by Douglas Adams, going so far as to name his sailboat 42.

Research

Quantum teleportation

Most widely known is his first realization of quantum teleportation of an independent qubit. He later expanded this work to developing a source for freely propagating teleported qubits and quantum teleportation over 144 kilometers between two Canary Islands. Quantum teleportation is an essential concept in many quantum information protocols. Besides its role for the transfer of quantum information, it is also considered as an important possible mechanism for building gates within quantum computers.

Entanglement swapping – teleportation of entanglement

Entanglement swapping is the teleportation of an entangled state. After its proposal, entanglement swapping has first been realized experimentally by Zeilinger's group in 1998. It was then applied to carry out a delayed-choice entanglement swapping test.

Entanglement beyond two qubits – GHZ-states and their realizations

Anton Zeilinger contributed decisively to the opening up of the field of multi-particle entanglement. In 1990, he was the first with Daniel Greenberger and Michael Horne to work on entanglement of more than two qubits. The resulting GHZ theorem (see Greenberger–Horne–Zeilinger state) is fundamental for quantum physics, as it provides the most succinct contradiction between local realism and the predictions of quantum mechanics.

GHZ states were the first instances of multi-particle entanglement ever investigated. 

Finally, in 1999, he succeeded in providing the first experimental evidence of entanglement beyond two particles and also the first test of quantum nonlocality for GHZ states.

Quantum communication, quantum cryptography, quantum computation

In 1998 (published in 2000), his group was the first to implement quantum cryptography with entangled photons.

He then also applied quantum entanglement to optical quantum computation, where in 2005, he performed the first implementation of one-way quantum computation. This is a protocol based on quantum measurement as proposed by Knill, Laflamme and Milburn. 

The experiments of Zeilinger and his group on the distribution of entanglement over large distances began with both free-space and fiber-based quantum communication and teleportation between laboratories located on the different sides of the river Danube. This was then extended to larger distances across the city of Vienna and over 144 km between two Canary Islands, resulting in a successful demonstration that quantum communication with satellites is feasible. His dream is to put sources of entangled light onto a satellite in orbit. A first step was achieved during an experiment at the Italian .

Further novel entangled states
With his group, Anton Zeilinger made many contributions to the realization of novel entangled states. The source for polarization-entangled photon pairs developed with Paul Kwiat when he was a PostDoc in Zeilinger's group became a workhorse in many laboratories worldwide. The first demonstration of entanglement of orbital angular momentum of photons opened up a new burgeoning field of research in many laboratories.

Macroscopic quantum superposition
Zeilinger is also interested to extend quantum mechanics into the macroscopic domain. In the early 1990s, he started experiments in the field of atom optics. He developed a number of ways to coherently manipulate atomic beams, many of which, like the coherent energy shift of an atomic De Broglie wave upon diffraction at a time-modulated light wave, have become cornerstones of today's ultracold atom experiments.  In 1999, Zeilinger abandoned atom optics for experiments with very complex and massive macro-molecules – fullerenes. The successful demonstration of quantum interference for these C60 and C70 molecules in 1999 opened up a very active field of research. 

In 2005, Zeilinger with his group again started a new field, the quantum physics of mechanical cantilevers. The group was the first – in the year 2006 along with work from Heidmann in Paris and Kippenberg in Garching – to demonstrate experimentally the self-cooling of a micro-mirror by radiation pressure, that is, without feedback. 

Using orbital angular momentum states, he was able to demonstrate entanglement of angular momentum up to 300 ħ.

Further fundamental tests
Zeilinger's program of fundamental tests of quantum mechanics is aimed at implementing experimental realizations of many non-classical features of quantum physics for individual systems. In 1998, he provided the final test of Bell's inequality closing the communication loophole by using superfast random number generators. His group also realized the first Bell inequality experiment implementing the freedom-of-choice condition and provided the first realization of a Bell test without the fair sampling assumption for photons.  

Among the further fundamental tests he performed the most notable one is his test of a large class of nonlocal realistic theories proposed by Leggett. The group of theories excluded by that experiment can be classified as those which allow reasonable subdivision of ensembles into sub-ensembles. It goes significantly beyond Bell's theorem. While Bell showed that a theory which is both local and realistic is at variance with quantum mechanics, Leggett considered nonlocal realistic theories where the individual photons are assumed to carry polarization. The resulting Leggett inequality was shown to be violated in the experiments of the Zeilinger group.

In an analogous way, his group showed that even quantum systems where entanglement is not possible exhibit non-classical features which cannot be explained by underlying non-contextual probability distributions.

Neutron interferometry
Anton Zeilinger's earliest work is perhaps his least known. His work on neutron interferometry has provided an important foundation for his later research achievements.
As a member of the group of his thesis supervisor, Helmut Rauch, at the Technical University of Vienna, Zeilinger participated in a number of neutron interferometry experiments at the Institut Laue–Langevin (ILL) in Grenoble. His very first such experiment confirmed a fundamental prediction of quantum mechanics, the sign change of a spinor phase upon rotation. This was followed by the first experimental realization of coherent spin superposition of matter waves. He continued his work in neutron interferometry at MIT with C.G. Shull (Nobel Laureate), focusing specifically on dynamical diffraction effects of neutrons in perfect crystals which are due to multi-wave coherent superposition. After his return to Europe, he built up an interferometer for very cold neutrons which preceded later similar experiments with atoms. The fundamental experiments there included a most precise test of the linearity of quantum mechanics. Zeilinger built a beautiful double-slit diffraction experiment on the S18 instrument at the Institut Laue-Langevin which, later on, gained in accuracy and could act with only one neutron at a time in the apparatus.

Works
Zeilinger has written more than 550 scientific articles, of which 500 are peer reviewed and 16 are considered highly cited papers.

Honours and awards

International prizes and awards
 Nobel Prize in Physics (2022, with John Clauser, Alain Aspect)
 Micius Quantum Prize, Micius Quantum Foundation (2019, with Stephen Wiesner, Charles H. Bennett, Gilles Brassard, Artur Ekert and Pan Jianwei)
 Cozzarelli Prize in Physical and Mathematical Sciences, PNAS and National Academy of Sciences (2018, with Alexey A. Melnikov, Hendrik Poulsen Nautrup, Mario Krenn, Vedran Dunjko, Markus Tiersch and Hans Briegel)
 John Stewart Bell Prize for Research on Fundamental Issues in Quantum Mechanics and their Applications, University of Toronto (2017, with Ronald Hanson and Sae Woo Nam)
 Silver medal of the Senate of the Czech Republic (2017)
 Willis E. Lamb Award, Physics of Quantum Electronics (PQE) conference (2016, with Robin Côté, Maciej Lewenstein and John Madey)
 Academy Medal of the Heidelberg Academy of Sciences and Humanities (2015)
 Urania Medal, Urania Berlin (2013)
 Finalist, World Technology Award for Communications Technology, World Technology Network (2012)
 Ben Gurion Medal, Ben-Gurion University of the Negev (2010)
 Wolf Prize in Physics, Wolf Foundation (2010, with Alain Aspect and John Clauser)
 Grand Merit Cross with Star of the Order of Merit of the Federal Republic of Germany (2009)
 ERC Advanced Grant, European Research Council (2008)
 International Quantum Communication Award, Tamagawa University (2008, with Jeffrey Shapiro, Akira Furusawa)
 Inaugural Isaac Newton Medal, Institute of Physics (2008)
 Quantum Electronics Prize, European Physical Society (2007)
 King Faisal International Prize in physics, King Faisal Foundation (2005)
 Descartes Prize, European Union, as member of the IST-QuComm project collaboration (2004)
 , Society of German Scientists and Physicians (2004)
 Klopsteg Memorial Award, American Association of Physics Teachers (2004)
 Sartorius Prize, Göttingen Academy of Sciences (2003)
 Order Pour le Mérite for Arts and Sciences (2000)
 Senior Humboldt Fellow Prize, Alexander von Humboldt Foundation (2000)
 European Optics Prize, European Optical Society (1996)
 European Lecturer, European Physical Society (1996)
 Prix Vinci d'Excellence (1995)

Austrian prizes and awards
 Grand Decoration of Honour in Gold for Services to Vienna, City of Vienna (2018)
 Grand Decoration of Honour for Services to the Republic of Austria (2015)
 Tiroler Adler Orden, State Government of Tyrol (2013)
 Grand Gold Decoration, City of Vienna (2006)
 Wilhelm Exner Medal, Austrian Trade Association (2005).
 Johannes Kepler-Prize, State Government of Upper Austria (2002)
 Austrian Decoration for Science and Art, Republic of Austria (2001)
 Visionary of the Year in Science (2001)
 Science Award of the City of Vienna (2000)
 Kardinal Innitzer Würdigungspreis, Roman Catholic Archdiocese of Vienna (1997)
 Austrian Scientist of the Year (1996)
 Junior Prize of the Theodor Körner Foundation (1980)
 Prize for Junior Scientists, Kardinal Innitzer Foundation (1979)
 Prize of the City of Vienna for the Encouragement of Young Scientists (1975)

Memberships
 Foreign Member of the National Academy of Sciences of Ukraine
 Foreign Member of the U.S. National Academy of Sciences
 Foreign Honorary Member of the Romanian Academy of Sciences
 Foreign Member of the Chinese Academy of Sciences
 Foreign Member of the Russian Academy of Sciences
 Foreign Member of the National Academy of Sciences of Belarus
 Fellow of the American Physical Society, the American Association for the Advancement of Science (AAAS), the World Academy of Sciences (TWAS) and Optica
 Socio Corrispondente Straniero, Accademia Galileiana
 Member of the German Academy of Sciences Leopoldina, Berlin-Brandenburg, Austrian, Slovak Academies of Sciences, the Academia Scientiarum et Artium Europaea, the Serbian Academy of Sciences and Arts, the Academia Europaea and the French Académie des Sciences

Further distinctions
 Honorary doctorates from the Humboldt University of Berlin (2005), the University of Gdańsk (2006), the National Academy of Sciences of Ukraine (2015), Technion (2020), the Okinawa Institute of Science and Technology Graduate University (2022) and the Israel Institute of Technology (2022)
 In 2009, Anton Zeilinger was among the "10 people who could change the world", elected by the British newspaper New Statesman.
 Asteroid 48681 Zeilinger (2005)
 Honorary professorships from the University of Science and Technology of China (1996), Nanjing University (2016) and Xi'an Jiaotong University (2019)

Distinguished lectureships
 S.N. Bose Memorial Lecture, S.N. Bose National Centre for Basic Sciences, India (2021)
 Golden Webinar, Pontifical Catholic University of Chile (2021)
 David M. Lee Historical Lecture in Physics, Harvard University, US (2019)
 Bethe Lectures, Cornell University, US (2016)
 Zhongshan Lecture, Nanjing University, China (2016)
 Robert Hofstadter Memorial Lecture, Stanford University, US (2015)
 Montroll Memorial Lecture, University of Rochester, US (2014)
 Herzberg Memorial Lecture, Canadian Association of Physicists, Canada (2012)
 Racah Lectures in Physics, Hebrew University, Israel (2012)
 Cherwell-Simon Memorial Lectures, Oxford University, UK (2012)
 Festkolloquium, 500. WE-Heraeus Seminar, Heraeus-Stiftung, Bad Honnef, Germany (2012)
 Vice-Chancellor's Open Lecture Series, University of Cape Town, South Africa (2011)
 Mark W. Zemansky Lecture, City College of New York, US (2011)
 Van Vleck Lecture, University of Minnesota, US (2011)
 Ockham Lecture, Merton College, Oxford University, UK (2010)
 Dvorak Memorial Lecture, University of Prague, Czech Republic (2010)
 Celsius Lecture, Uppsala University, Sweden (2010)
 Carl Friedrich von Weizsäcker Lectures, University of Hamburg, Germany (2009)
 Festvortrag, 150th birthday of Max Planck, Max Planck Society, German Physical Society, Berlin-Brandenburg Academy of Sciences, Humboldt University Berlin, Germany (2009)
 Inaugural Kavli Colloquium, Kavli Institute of Nanoscience, Delft University of Technology, Netherlands (2009)
 Newton Prize Lecture, Institute of Physics, UK (2008)
 Asher Perez Memorial Lecture, Technion, Israel (2008)
 Wolfgang-Paul Lecture, Bonn University, Germany (2007)
 Seventh Johannes Gutenberg Endowed Professorship, Johannes Gutenberg University Mainz, Germany (2006)
 Colloquium Ehrenfestii, Leiden University, Netherlands (2004)
 Angstrom Lecture, Uppsala University, Sweden (2003)
 Amos de-Shalit Memorial Lecture, Weizmann Institute, Israel (2003)
 Solly Cohen and Shimon Ofer Memorial Lecture, Racah Institute of Physics, Hebrew University of Jerusalem, Israel (2003)
 Schrödinger Lecture, Imperial College, UK (2003)
 Niels Bohr Lecture, Copenhagen University, Denmark (2003)
 Schrödinger Lecture, Trinity College, Ireland (1999)
 H.L. Welsh Lecture in Physics, University of Toronto, Canada (1997)
 Colloquium Ehrenfestii, Leiden University, Netherlands (1996)
Sir Thomas Lyle Lecture, University of Melbourne, Australia (1984)

In popular culture
Zeilinger has been interviewed by Morgan Freeman in season 2 of Through the Wormhole.

References

External links

 
 
Curriculum Vitae of Anton Zeilinger

Quantum Teleportation by Zeilinger, 2003 update of 2000 Scientific American article

Spooky action and beyond an interview with Anton Zeilinger at signandsight.com
The lecture delivered by Professor Anton Zeilinger as the inaugural recipient of the Isaac Newton Medal, Institute of Physics, 17 June 2008,  (68 min 25 sec). Note: On the page linked, a second video is accommodated which shows Professor Zeilinger speaking amongst others about his personal life.
Anton Zeilinger on the opening panel discussion at the Quantum to Cosmos festival at Perimeter Institute with Katherine Freese, Leo Kadanoff, Lawrence Krauss, Neil Turok, Sean M. Carroll, Gino Segrè, Andrew White, and David Tong.
Homepage of the International Academy Traunkirchen
Es stellt sich letztlich heraus, dass Information ein wesentlicher Grundbaustein der Welt ist, a German-language interview with Zeilinger by Andrea Naica-Loebell

1945 births
Living people
People from Ried im Innkreis District
Quantum physicists
Austrian physicists
Academic staff of the Technical University of Munich
Academic staff of the University of Vienna
Academic staff of the University of Innsbruck
Academic staff of the Collège de France
Massachusetts Institute of Technology faculty
Academic staff of the Humboldt University of Berlin
Fellows of Merton College, Oxford
Members of the Serbian Academy of Sciences and Arts
Members of the Austrian Academy of Sciences
Academic staff of TU Wien
Wolf Prize in Physics laureates
Knights Commander of the Order of Merit of the Federal Republic of Germany
Recipients of the Austrian Decoration for Science and Art
Recipients of the Pour le Mérite (civil class)
Members of the French Academy of Sciences
Members of the European Academy of Sciences and Arts
Foreign associates of the National Academy of Sciences
Foreign Members of the Russian Academy of Sciences
Foreign members of the Chinese Academy of Sciences
Slovak academics
European Research Council grantees
Nobel laureates in Physics
Austrian Nobel laureates
Fellows of the American Physical Society